The Ligier Optima is a four-wheeled, two-seater microcar manufactured from 1987 to about 1995 by Ligier, the street vehicle branch of French Formula One manufacturer Équipe Ligier. There was also a four-seat version offered from 1993 until 1995, called the Optima 4. The car was originally introduced as the Ligier Série 7, but the name was changed to Optima in 1989. It replaced the earlier Série 5, the final development of a series of cars which started with the boxy Ligier JS4. Commonly, Optimas are "", light vehicles which do not require a driver's license and thus popular with the elderly, the young, or with those who had lost their driving privileges. Ligier also offered more powerful versions which could be driven with certain limited driver's permits and with very low annual taxes. Versions for export markets often had slightly different engine outputs to meet local requirements.

Série 7

Introduced in 1987, the Série 7 was decidedly more car-like in appearance than the earlier JS4-derived Série 5. The increase in length also made the car more practical, with a considerably larger cargo area. The car was introduced with a 325 cc single-cylinder diesel engine, but this was soon replaced with an air-cooled 265 cc engine built by Fuji Robin in Japan. The later engine develops a claimed , reflecting adjustments in French law resulting from the adoption of SI units.

There was also a version called the Série 7 Twin (or 650 Twin) which required a special quadricycle license and was taxed at 1CV (one tax horsepower, the lowest rating possible). This had a two-cylinder diesel engine built by Italy's . This was sold as the Ligier ATW 50L (later the ATW-Plus 50L).

Optima

The car received a thorough facelift in November 1989, with orange front turn signals which wrap around the corners, and the name was changed to Ligier Optima. Initially, only the 265 cc diesel engine was on offer, but later there was also an Optima/Optimax Twin available. The two-cylinder versions received front disc brakes. A van with a built-out, boxier rear end along the lines of the Renault Express or the Citroën C15, was also available under the name Optimax. AutoTechnik Walther (ATW) kept on offering a 49-cc version with a German Sachs engine, to meet local needs for permitless operation. ATW also developed a version with an electric motor, which they installed in their Bad Rappenau facilities. The price was also elevated - with a few options, the price could easily reach  in 1993,  and the same as a base model Audi 100 at the time.

After a minor facelift in 1992, the model was sometimes referred to as Optima II. In 1993 it was updated again, now with a larger grille opening with a mesh inside, changing name to Prima (the commercial model was still called the Optimax). The Optima Twin was replaced by the stretched Optima 4, thus named as it could seat four thanks to a longer wheelbase. The Optima 4 offered separately removable rear seats and was only sold with full equipment including tinted windows and seat belts front and rear. The Twin's engine was replaced with a three-cylinder diesel engine by British Perkins Engines, developing  at 3,600 rpm. As with the preceding Optima Twin, this version has front disc brakes to handle the more than doubled power and added weight.

See also 
 Guy Ligier

References

External links 

 Official website

Microcars
Optima
Quadricycles
Vehicles introduced in 1987
Front-wheel-drive vehicles